Nephrozoa is a major clade of bilaterians, divided into the protostomes and the deuterostomes, containing almost all animal phyla and over a million extant species. Its sister clade is the Xenacoelomorpha. The Ambulacraria (conventionally deuterostomes) was formerly thought to be sister to the Xenacoelomorpha, forming the Xenambulacraria as basal Deuterostomes, or basal Bilateria invalidating Nephrozoa and Deuterostomes in earlier studies. The coelom, the digestive tract and excretory organs (nephridia), and nerve cords developed in the Nephrozoa. It has been argued that, because protonephridia are only found in protostomes, they cannot be considered a synapomorphy of this group. This would make Nephrozoa an improper name, leaving Eubilateria as this clade's name.

Chordates (which include all the vertebrates) are deuterostomes. It seems very likely that the  Kimberella was a protostome. If so, this means that the protostome and deuterostome lineages must have split some time before Kimberella appeared — at least , and hence well before the start of the Cambrian .

References

Further reading

External links
 

 
Bilaterians
Ediacaran first appearances